Polyides rotunda is a species of small red marine alga in the family Polyidaceae.

Description 
The holdfast is disc like. In colour it is purplish red.

Habitat
Generally epilithic in rock pools in the littoral and upper sublittoral. Sand tolerant.

Distribution
Generally distributed around Ireland, Great Britain, the Isle of Man and the Channel Islands.

Reproduction
Polyides rotunda is dioecious. The spermatangial cells develop in swollen areas near the apices. Cystocarps develop near the apices. The tetrasporangia are cruciate, that is cross-shaped.

Similar species
Furcellaria lumbricalis (Hudson) Lamouroux is very similar but can be distinguished by the holdfast  which has claw-like branches while that of Polyides being disc-like.

References

Gigartinales
Taxa described in 1822